This is a list of singles that charted in the top ten of the ARIA Charts in 2005.

Top-ten singles

Key

2004 peaks

2006 peaks

Entries by artist
The following table shows artists who achieved two or more top 10 entries in 2005, including songs that reached their peak in 2004 and 2006. The figures include both main artists and featured artists. The total number of weeks an artist spent in the top ten in 2005 is also shown.

References 

Top 10 singles
Australia Top 10 singles
Top 10 singles 2005
Australia 2005